Daniel Eduardo Luis Sáez (born 11 May 1994), known as Daniel Luis, is a Cuban footballer.

Club career
A tall central midfielder, Luis has played primarily for his hometown team La Habana, except for a stint at Camagüey in 2017.

On 9 March 2022, Lios signed with USL Championship side Rio Grande Valley FC.

International career
Luis played in three games at the 2013 FIFA U-20 World Cup, but had made his senior international debut for Cuba already in an October 2012 FIFA World Cup qualification match against Panama when he came on as a very late substitute for Ariel Martinez. He has, as of January 2018, earned a total of 12 caps, scoring 1 goal.

Luis took part in the CONCACAF Olympic qualifying tournament in Antigua and Barbuda. He was named in the Cuba squad for the 2015 CONCACAF Gold Cup but missed the first game against Mexico due to US visa complications.

On 21 June 2019, after Cuba's second match at the 2019 CONCACAF Gold Cup, Luis along two other teammates defected.

International goals
Scores and results list Cuba's goal tally first.

References

External links
 
 

1994 births
Living people
Cuban footballers
Cuba international footballers
Cuba youth international footballers
Association football midfielders
FC Ciudad de La Habana players
FC Camagüey players
Atlántico FC players
Delfines del Este FC players
Liga Dominicana de Fútbol players
2015 CONCACAF Gold Cup players
2019 CONCACAF Gold Cup players
Cuban expatriate footballers
Cuban expatriate sportspeople in the Dominican Republic
Expatriate footballers in the Dominican Republic
Sportspeople from Havana
USL League Two players
Rio Grande Valley FC Toros players